MILF (as if read as "milf") is an acronym that stands for "Mother I'd Like to Fuck". This abbreviation is used in colloquial English, instead of the whole phrase. It connotes an older woman, typically one with children, considered sexually attractive.  A related term is "cougar", which suggests an older woman in active pursuit of younger men.

History 
Linguist Laurel A. Sutton states that MILF was one of nine terms for "attractive women" collected from undergraduates at a large linguistics class at Berkeley in the spring of 1992. Stereotypical users would be "college students from East Contra Costa, California". The term was widely popularized by the film American Pie (1999), where John Cho's character (simply credited as 'MILF Guy No. 2') used the term to refer to Jennifer Coolidge's character Jeanine Stifler. American Pie screenwriter Adam Herz stated that he did not invent the phrase.

A 2007 article in New York magazine stated the evidence that the term had become mainstream included "25,000-plus MILF-branded mugs and tees on Café Press to a rash of hot-mama books (The Hot Mom's Handbook, Confessions of a Naughty Mommy, The MILF Anthology), television shows (Desperate Housewives, The Real Housewives of Orange County, the forthcoming contest 'Hottest Mom in America', and a pilot in development called MILF & Cookies), and, of course, a concomitant porn genre".

Some media outlets found the expression offensive to women, and suggested replacing it with WHIP, which stands for "women who are hot, intelligent and in their prime".

Similar terms
The term yummy mummy is also used along with MILF. The Oxford English Dictionary defines the term as "an attractive and stylish young mother".

Although not yet as widespread in popular culture at large, the forms DILF (for "Dad/Daddy I'd Like to Fuck") or FILF (for "Father I'd Like to Fuck") are used among androphiles to refer to a sexually attractive older man who is likely a father.

The terms GILF (for "Granny I'd Like to Fuck") and silver fox refer to attractive, highly-sexual older women (55+), regardless of child-bearing status. Silver fox can refer to any gender.

In popular culture 
In 2002, a resident of the U.S. state of Washington applied for a vanity license plate reading "GOTMILF", a parody of the "Got Milk?" advertising slogan. This plate was approved (the applicant wrote a different meaning for "MILF" than what he intended), but it was later cancelled after complaints were filed against it.

In December 2007, low-cost carrier Spirit Airlines ran a controversial advertising campaign, using MILF(s) to promote their tropical destinations, based on a different acronym: "Many Islands, Low Fares". In January 2009, Spirit ran the campaign again.

In 2013, an apparel company, True & Co., parodied the phrase in advertising for its line of brassieres, converting it to "Mom I'd Like to Fit". The campaign garnered negative attention for the San Francisco, California, U.S.-based company.

A 2014 article in Playboy magazine by Purdue University, sex educator and researcher Justin Lehmiller referenced the work of Sigmund Freud and Alfred Kinsey to explain the fascination with the MILF phenomenon.

SMILF is an American comedy television series starring, created, written and directed by Frankie Shaw on Showtime. It is based on Shaw's short film of the same title. The series' name, SMILF, is a play on the term "MILF", with the "S" standing for "single" or "Southie" (a nickname for South Boston, Massachusetts), or both. The series was cancelled on March 8, 2019, after two seasons.

In 2016, Fergie released the song "M.I.L.F. $" as well as an accompanying video featuring numerous famous mothers.

The 2018 French comedy film MILF is about three childhood friends who become MILFs, seducing three young men.

In the video game Friday Night Funkin', a song called "M.I.L.F." is named after the same phrase.

See also 
Age disparity in sexual relationships
Cougar (slang)
Gerontophilia
MILF pornography

References

External links 

Acronyms
Pornography terminology
Sexuality and age
Slang terms for women
2000s slang
2010s slang